Begonia teuscheri is a species of is a species of plant in the family Begoniaceae. It is endemic to Malaysia.

References 

teuscheri
Flora of Peninsular Malaysia